School of Hard Knocks is an idiomatic phrase meaning the (sometimes painful) education one gets from life's usually negative experiences.

School of Hard Knocks may also refer to:
 School of Hard Knocks (Desperate Housewives), an episode of Desperate Housewives
 School of Hard Knocks (TV series), a British television series
 School of Hard Knocks, a 1990 album by Pat Travers Band
 School of Hard Knocks (song), a 2000 song by  P.O.D.

See also
 School of Life (disambiguation)